is a third-person shooter hack and slash video game developed by Rebellion Developments and published by Konami for the PlayStation 3 and Xbox 360.

Gameplay
The protagonist is an immortal and is able to survive severe injuries. Over time, the player loses body parts and will have to collect the removed limbs by rolling into them. Players can cause large objects to crush nearby enemies, harming them but not the player themselves. The Gameplay also features puzzle elements. A female partner assists the player, however she is not immortal and the player gets injured trying to protect her.

Plot
The player controls a wisecracking human demon hunter named Bryce, who was cursed with immortality five hundred years ago by the demon king Astaroth. Now in modern times, he hunts demons for money and revenge with a female private investigator in order to stop a demonic invasion that has nearly destroyed the city.

Characters

Bryce Boltzmann
Voiced by (English): David LodgeVoiced by (Japanese): Hiroshi Shirokuma

A wisecracking demon hunter who was cursed with immortality five centuries ago by Astaroth after he witnessed the brutal murder of his wife at the hands of the aforementioned demon king. Since then, he has become a disheveled, bitter alcoholic who hunts demons for money and revenge, often using his ability to remove and reattach his limbs to his own advantage. Now in modern times, he is accompanied by a female private investigator, Arcadia.

Arcadia Maximille
Voiced by (English): Michelle RuffVoiced by (Japanese): Sayaka Kinoshita

Bryce's partner. She is cold and methodical.

Astaroth
Voiced by (English): Joe RomersaVoiced by (Japanese): Kiyoyuki Yanada

The main antagonist of the game. Astaroth is the demon king who murdered Bryce's wife. While Bryce was horrified by the murder, Astaroth gouged out one of his eyes and cursed Bryce with immortality. Astaroth is the demon king responsible for the demon invasion in the city.

Development
The game was directed by Shinta Nojiri, and developed by Rebellion Developments.

Music

The main soundtrack to the game was composed by Megadeth, while the credits song "Pharaoh★Love" is composed by Osamu Migitera (Des-ROW) with vocals by Megumi Nakajima or Brittney Snyder depending if the player has set the game language in Japanese or English. Also, the song was made playable in REFLEC BEAT limelight and Pop'n Music Portable 2.

Reception

NeverDead received "mixed" reviews on both platforms according to the review aggregation website Metacritic.  In Japan, Famitsu gave it a score of all four eights for a total of 32 out of 40.

The Digital Fix gave the PlayStation 3 version a score of seven out of ten and said that "its successes far outweigh its failings and for every frustration such as the pitch black sequence (where you have to set yourself on fire to find your way out) there are multiple moments of humour backed up by a solid combat system. It's not going to change the shape of gaming or be remembered forever but it far exceeds any claims that the body destruction element is a gimmick and nothing more. NeverDead deserves to be played but a sequel only deserves to happen if Konami and Rebellion give Bryce the world and freedom you will want to see him in." Digital Spy gave the Xbox 360 version a score of three stars out of five and called it "a prime example of a game that conjures an excellent premise, but then destroys it with poor design choices. We don't play games to be exhausted, we play them to have fun, and there are just too many moments in this game that feel like a chore." The Escapist similarly gave it a score of three stars out of five and said, "NeverDead does try something new and original, but its mechanics are unpolished and poorly implemented." However, 411Mania gave it a score of 4.5 out of 10 and said it was "very predictable and uninspired." GameZone gave the PS3 version 3.5 out of 10 and said, "We had high hopes for NeverDead, especially after seeing it at E3, but the end result falls apart as quickly as Bryce does.  The gameplay never really develops a structure that leads to any fun, and the presentation's flaws are hard to overlook.  You should easily brush this zombie killer aside in favor of Dante, even if that means reverting back to Devil May Cry 4."

References

External links
 

2012 video games
Action video games
Hack and slash games
Konami games
PlayStation 3 games
Post-apocalyptic video games
Rebellion Developments games
Third-person shooters
Video games developed in the United Kingdom
Video games featuring non-playable protagonists
Video games set in psychiatric hospitals
Xbox 360 games
Single-player video games